Donal O'Sullivan may refer to:

Donal O'Sullivan (artist) (1945–1991), Irish artist
Donal Cam O'Sullivan Beare (1561–1613), last independent ruler of the O'Sullivan Beara clan
Donal O'Sullivan (Gaelic footballer) (1930–2001), Irish Gaelic football player
Donal O'Sullivan (politician) (1893–1973), Irish senator
Donal O'Sullivan (priest) (1890–1916), Irish Catholic priest